Robsart Art Works (RAW) was an art studio and museum featuring local and regional artist from Southwest Saskatchewan and region.

Purpose
The Robsart Art Works gallery was located in the historic 1913 Revelstoke Lumber yard office building, the gallery was started as a venue for performing artists to help with the revival of Robsart.
 
Located on Railway Avenue in the hamlet of Robsart, Saskatchewan, Robsart Art Works was a part of the Southwest Quest For Saskatchewan Art & History, which is a self-guided tour of historic sites and artists' studios in SW Saskatchewan including Maple Creek, Eastend, Shaunavon, Gull Lake and Val Marie

Artworks
The building, as of August 2014, is a studio for Robsart Art Retreats.

References

Art museums and galleries in Saskatchewan
Contemporary art galleries in Canada
Arts organizations based in Canada
Reno No. 51, Saskatchewan